Peter Baltes (born 4 April 1958) is a German hard rock and heavy metal musician. He is the former bassist of the heavy metal group Accept, having played bass guitar on their first 15 albums. He joined them in 1976 after Dieter Rubach left the band and also made minor contributions as a lead vocalist with Accept on their early albums and on the album Predator of 1996. After 42 years as a member, Baltes announced his departure from Accept in November 2018; the band later replaced him with former Uli Jon Roth sideman Martin Motnik.

Other recording credits 
Recording background vocals on the Scorpions' Savage Amusement album.
Played bass on John Norum's albums Face the Truth, Worlds Away, and more.
Played bass and background vocals on Don Dokken's solo effort Up from the Ashes.
Played bass on Dokken "Breaking The Chains"

References

External links 

Accept website

Living people
1958 births
People from Solingen
Converts to Protestantism from atheism or agnosticism
German Christians
German male musicians
German heavy metal musicians
German heavy metal bass guitarists
Male bass guitarists
Accept (band) members
Dokken members
German male guitarists